Frederick Howard Garratt (20 October 1888–1967) was an English footballer who played in the Football League for Notts County and Stockport County.

References

1888 births
1967 deaths
English footballers
Association football defenders
English Football League players
Notts County F.C. players
Stockport County F.C. players